Maidstone Aerodrome  is located  north-west of Maidstone, Saskatchewan, Canada.

See also 
 List of airports in Saskatchewan

References 

Registered aerodromes in Saskatchewan
Eldon No. 471, Saskatchewan